Frederick Pond Ferré (March 23, 1933 – March 22, 2013) was Professor of Philosophy Emeritus at The University of Georgia. He was a past president of the Metaphysical Society of America. Much of his work concerned how metaphysics is entwined with practical questions about how we live our life, including the ethical dimensions of life.

Education 
 Oberlin College, 1950–51.
 Boston University, A.B. (major History) summa cum laude, 1954
 Vanderbilt University, M.A. (Philosophy of History) 1955.
 Vanderbilt University Divinity School (Theological Studies) 1955–56.
 University of St. Andrews (Scotland), Ph.D. (Philosophy of Religion) 1959.

Work 
His most notable contribution to scholarship was a defense of Christian metaphysics in response to the charge of people like G.E. Moore and Bertrand Russell that Christian claims are linguistically meaningless and should be rejected as such. Ferre argued that Christian metaphysics was legitimate because it passed a fourfold test of a metaphysical worldview, being consistent, coherent, applicable, and adequate.

Bibliography
 Language, Logic And God (1961), Harper
 Basic Modern Philosophy Of Religion (1967) Scribner
 Being And Value : Toward A Constructive Postmodern Metaphysics (1996) State University of New York Press
 Ethics And Environmental Policy : Theory Meets Practice (1994) with Peter Hartel  University of Georgia Press
 God And Global Justice : Religion And Poverty In An Unequal World (1985) with Rita H. Mataragnon, Paragon House 
 Philosophy Of Technology (1988), Prentice Hall
 Hellfire And Lightning Rods : Liberating Science, Technology, And Religion (1993), Orbis Books 
 Introduction To Positive Philosophy. / Edited, With Introd. And Rev. Translation, By Frederick Ferré (1970), Bobbs-Merrill 
 Knowing And Value : Toward A Constructive Postmodern Epistemology (1998) State University of New York Press 
 Living And Value : Toward A Constructive Postmodern Ethics (2001), State University of New York Press
 "Mapping the Logic of Models in Science and Theology" Christian Scholar, Volume 46, 1963

References

Further reading
 George Allan, Merle Frederick Allshouse: Nature, Truth, And Value, Lexington Books, 2006.

American Christian theologians
Philosophers of religion
Presidents of the Metaphysical Society of America
2013 deaths
1933 births